PT Boat Museum is located in Fall River, Massachusetts as part of Battleship Cove.  It is a museum that exhibits two National Historic Landmark ships, an  Elco boat, PT 617, and a  Higgins boat, PT 796.

External links
PT Boat Museum, official site

Buildings and structures in Fall River, Massachusetts
Maritime museums in Massachusetts
Museums in Bristol County, Massachusetts
Tourist attractions in Fall River, Massachusetts